James Flint may refer to:
 James Flint (architect) (1862–1894), Australian architect
 James Flint (novelist) (born 1968), British novelist
 James Flint (merchant), 18th century British diplomat and merchant
 Captain Flint, a fictional character, created by Robert Louis Stevenson
 Captain James Flint, a fictional character in the Swallows and Amazons series of books
 Bruiser Flint (James Flint, born 1965), American basketball coach
 James Flint (RAF officer) (1913–2013), British businessman and officer
 James Flint (1733–1810), Scottish surgeon, co-founder of the Royal Society of Edinburgh